Metela Island is one of the many uninhabited Canadian arctic islands in Qikiqtaaluk Region, Nunavut. It is a Baffin Island offshore island located in Frobisher Bay, southeast of the capital city of Iqaluit. Other islands in the immediate vicinity include Camp Island, Dog Island, Kungo Island, Quadrifid Island, and Sliver Island.

References 

Uninhabited islands of Qikiqtaaluk Region
Islands of Baffin Island
Islands of Frobisher Bay